Jafarabad (also Romanized as Ja‘farābād) is a village in Palangabad Rural District, Palangabad District, Eshtehard County, Alborz Province, Iran. At the 2006 census, its population was 70, in 22 families.

References 

Populated places in Eshtehard County